Dasar Upazila is an upazila of Madaripur district in the Division of Dhaka, Bangladesh. Dasar Upazila consists of five unions of Baligram, Kazibakai, Gopalpur, Dasar and Nabagram. The area of this upazila is 76.8 km2. According to the 2011 census, the population of Dasar is 71,494. The Palrodi river flows over Dasar Upazila.

History 
A police investigation centre was set up in Dasar on February 2, 2012. Later, the Dasar Thana (police station) was formed on March 2, 2013, with five unions of Kalkini Upazila. Shortly thereafter, the local administration proposed to convert Dasar into upazila. At the meeting of the National Implementation Committee on Administrative Restructuring (NICAR) on November 20, 2017, the Dasar Thana (police station) was supposed to be upgraded to upazila but it was rejected and asked to conduct a further examination. Then, on July 26, 2021, at the 117th meeting of NICAR, it was decided to make Dasar a full-fledged upazila.

Administrative areas 
Dasar Upazila consists of 5 unions and has 67 mouzas.

Unions 

 Gopalpur Union
 Kazibakai Union
 Baligram Union
 Dasar Union
 Nabagram Union

Geograph 
Its total area is 76.08 km2. Dasar upazila is bounded on the north by Madaripur Sadar upazila, on the south by Agailjhara Upazila, on the east by Kalkini upazila and on the west by Kotalipara upazila.

References 

Upazilas of Madaripur District